Dasyanthina is a genus of flowering plants belonging to the family Asteraceae.

Its native range is Southeastern Brazil to Paraguay.

Species:

Dasyanthina palustris 
Dasyanthina serrata

References

Asteraceae
Asteraceae genera